The Mesa River is a river in the Sierra de Solorio range area, Iberian System, Spain.
It is a tributary of the Piedra River. 

There are trout in the river, but the population of the endangered European freshwater crayfish in the river has practically disappeared owing to the introduction of the North American signal crayfish (Pacifastacus leniusculus).

Geography
It rises near Selas, in the province of Guadalajara, Castile-La Mancha. The Mesa has an irregular flow, due to the long dry season of the summer months, with often heavy rainfall in the spring and autumn. It receives much water at Jaraba, where there are thermal springs.

The Mesa River cuts a deep canyon, locally known as Hoces del Río Mesa (Mesa River Gorges) or Valle del Mesa (Mesa Valley).

See also 
 List of rivers of Spain

References

External links

Rivers of Spain
Rivers of Castilla–La Mancha
Ebro basin
Province of Zaragoza
Province of Guadalajara